Horsepen was an unincorporated community in Mingo County, West Virginia, United States. Their Post Office  no longer exists.

The community was named for the fact Indians once corralled stolen horses near the site.

References 

Unincorporated communities in West Virginia
Unincorporated communities in Mingo County, West Virginia